The 1926–27 Divizia A was the fifteenth season of Divizia A, the top-level football league of Romania.

Participating teams

Final Tournament of Regions

Preliminary Round

Quarters

Semifinals

Final

Champion squad

References

Liga I seasons
Romania
1926–27 in Romanian football